The Burnaby Refinery is an oil refinery located in the city of Burnaby, British Columbia, Canada owned by Parkland Fuel Corp.  The facility refines crude and synthetic oil into gasoline, diesel, jet fuels, asphalts, heating fuels, heavy fuel oils, butanes, and propane. Crude oil is supplied to the facility from Northern British Columbia and Alberta through the 1,200-kilometre Kinder Morgan Pipe Line.  The refinery is divided into Area 1 (the original site) now used for offices and oil storage and Area 2 the modern refining area.  The refinery has a Nelson Complexity Index of 9.1
Former and original owner-operator Chevron sold its Canadian assets to Parkland Fuel Corp for C$1.46 billion ($1.09 billion) in April 2017, including 129 gasoline stations, three terminals and the Burnaby oil refinery.
According to the Oil & Gas Journal, the refinery completed a major turnaround in Spring 2020.

History

The refinery was established in 1935 by Standard Oil of California as one of few heavy industries in the area at that time - 2000 bbls/day. Major expansion took place in the mid 1950s to 11,000 bbls/day as part of post war BC building boom. Further capacity increases in the mid 1970s to 35,000 bbls/day including a steady advancement in technology. Other lower mainland refineries were converted to terminals in the early 1990s with production transferred to Alberta.

References

External links
 Parkland Company Web-site
 Former Chevron Company Web-site

Oil refineries in Canada
Buildings and structures in Burnaby